The Bloße Zelle is, at 480 m, the highest elevation on the Hils and in the Alfeld Uplands (Ith-Hils Upland). It lies on the boundary of the districts of Holzminden and Hildesheim, a good 4 kilometres northeast of Eschershausen.

With a topographic isolation of 18 kilometres and a prominence of about 235 metres, the Hils and the Blöße are among the loftiest ridges and summits, respectively, in the Lower Saxon Hills.

References 

Hills of Lower Saxony
Holzminden (district)
Hildesheim (district)